Chlorella pulchelloides is a species of euryhaline, unicellular microalga in the Division Chlorophyta. It is spherical to oval-shaped and is solitary

References

Further reading

Li, Bo, Jia Feng, and Shu-lian Xie. "Morphological and phylogenetic study of algal partners associated with the lichen-forming fungus Porpidia crustulata from the Guancen Mountains, northern China." Symbiosis 61.1 (2013): 37–46.
Bashan, Yoav, et al. "Chlorella sorokiniana (formerly C. vulgaris) UTEX 2714, a non-thermotolerant microalga useful for biotechnological applications and as a reference strain." Journal of Applied Phycology (2015): 1–9.

External links
AlgaeBase

pulchelloides